'Roots and Wings is the fourth studio album by the Belgian one woman band Vaya Con Dios, released in 1995.

Track listing

Charts

Certifications

References

External links
Roots and Wings at Discogs

1995 albums
Vaya Con Dios (band) albums